Tolidostena fusei is a beetle in the genus Tolidostena of the family Mordellidae. It was described by Tokeji.

References

Mordellidae